In 1996, 19 cheeses from Greece were awarded Protected Designation of Origin (PDO) status defining their areas of origin and methods of production. Feta received the same status in 2002 and Xygalo Sitias in 2008. The designated cheeses are made from fresh milk by traditional methods. They contain predominantly sheep or sheep and goat's milk.

The use of cow's milk is not traditional in Greece as the nature of much of the terrain favours the farming of sheep and goats. Such cow's milk as is produced is mainly destined for drinking or the production of processed cheese. The Greek cheeses containing cow's milk that have PDO status are Graviera Naxou, San Michali and Metsovone (which also contains sheep's milk).

Cow's milk cheeses 

 Graviera Naxou
 San Michali, a firm buttery cheese from the island of Syros

Sheep's milk cheeses
 Kasseri (Κασέρι)
 Graviera Kritis (may include some goat's milk)
 Kalathaki Limnou (Καλαθάκι Λήμνου), a brine cheese produced on the island of Limnos
 Formaela Arachovas Parnassou )

Mixed milk cheeses

Cow/Sheep
 Metsovone (Μετσοβόνε), a semi-hard smoked cheese
 Graviera Agrafon (Γραβιέρα Αγράφων)

Sheep/Goat
 Feta, the most popular of Greek cheeses
 Kefalograviera 
 Kopanisti (Κοπανιστή), a pink, spicy cheese that owes its hotness to fungal growth; from Mykonos island and the surrounding Cyclades
 Manouri, a semi-soft fresh whey cheese
 Xynomizithra
 Anevato, a spreadable, creamy cheese
 Galotyri, a soft, creamy cheese produced in Epirus and Thessaly
 Katiki Domokou, a spreadable, moist, slightly spicy white cheese; from Domokos, Thessaly
 Ladotyri Mytilinis, a sharp, salty cheese that matures immersed in jars of olive oil; from Mytilini Island
 Batzos, a salty, semi-hard to hard cheese which matures and is preserved in brine
 Pichtogalo Chanion, a white table cheese produced in the prefecture of Chania, Crete
 Sfela, also referred to as "Fire Feta", a mildly spicy soft white cheese from Messenia, Peloponnese
 Xygalo Siteias, a soft cheese produced in the easternmost portion of the island of Crete

Goat's milk cheese
There are several types of cheese made solely from goat's milk in Greece, but no applications have been submitted for PDO status, yet.

See also
Cuisine of Greece

References

Sources

External links
Greek Ministry of Rural Development and Food

 
Greek PDO
+GreeceList of Greek Protected Designations of Origin cheeses